President of Germany may refer to:
 the President of the Federal Republic of Germany
 a president of Germany during the Weimar Republic
 a president or similar leader of the German Democratic Republic (East Germany)
 William I, President of North German Confederation in 1866—1871.

Lists of presidents and other heads of state 
 List of German presidents, which includes other heads of state, acting heads of state, etc.